Sir Bernard McCloskey, styled The Rt Hon Lord Justice McCloskey, is a Northern Ireland judge, who has been a Lord Justice of Appeal since September 2019. He was called to the bar in 1979, made a Queen's Counsel (QC) in 1999, and appointed a High Court Judge in 2008. He served as chair of the Northern Ireland Law Commission from 2009 to 2012.

References

Living people
Year of birth missing (living people)
Knights Bachelor
High Court judges of Northern Ireland
Lords Justice of Appeal of Northern Ireland
Members of the Privy Council of the United Kingdom